WRCD (101.5 FM) is a commercial radio station broadcasting a classic rock radio format. Licensed to Canton, New York, the station is owned by the Stephens Media Group.  WRCD is an affiliate of the "Bob and Tom Show."

WRCD has an effective radiated power (ERP) of 50,000 watts.  It covers much of St. Lawrence County, New York and Eastern Ontario.

History
In 1996, the station signed on the air.  Its original call sign was WXQZ.  WXQZ broadcast a country format as "Fun 101". In 1999, it switched its call letters to WRCD. WRCD first had a mainstream rock format as "Rock 101.5" before flipping to its current format and branding.

The station was previously owned by Martz Communications Group, and was acquired by Stephens as of February 1, 2008.

References

External links
WRCD website

RCD
1996 establishments in New York (state)
Radio stations established in 1996